Charles B. Wheeler Downtown Airport  is a city-owned, public-use airport serving Kansas City, Missouri. Located in Clay County, this facility is included in the National Plan of Integrated Airport Systems, which categorized it as a general aviation reliever airport.

History

This airport replaced Richards Field as Kansas City's main airport.  It was dedicated as New Richards Field in 1927 by Charles Lindbergh and was soon renamed Kansas City Municipal Airport.  Its prominent tenant was Trans World Airlines (TWA), which was headquartered in Kansas City.  The airport was built in the Missouri River bottoms next to the rail tracks at the Hannibal Bridge.  At the time air travel was considered to be handled in conjunction with rail traffic.

The airport had limited area for expansion (Fairfax Airport across the Missouri River in Kansas City, Kansas covered a larger area).  Airplanes had to avoid the  Quality Hill and the Downtown Kansas City skyline south of the south end of the main runway.  In the early 1960s, an FAA memo called it "the most dangerous major airport in the country" and urged that no further federal funds be spent on it. A new airport was then constructed to serve Kansas City, being the Kansas City International Airport (MCI) which was opened in 1972 with all scheduled passenger airline flights being moved from MKC to MCI at that time.

The April 1957 Official Airline Guide (OAG) listed the following weekday departures from MKC: 
 Braniff International Airways - 40 
 Trans World Airlines (TWA) - 39
 Continental Airlines - 9
 United Airlines - 4
 Delta Air Lines - 2
 Ozark Airlines - 2
 Central Airlines - 2

The downtown airport has been renamed for Charles Wheeler who was mayor when Kansas City International opened.  Richards Road, which serves the airport, is named for John Francisco Richards II, a Kansas City airman killed in World War I (and whose name was also applied to Richards Field and Richards-Gebaur Air Force Base).

Despite concerns about the airport being unsafe, Air Force One frequently uses it during Presidential visits.

Today the airport is used for corporate and recreational aviation.  The terminal building today houses VML, a global advertising and marketing agency headquartered in Kansas City.  Its location near downtown has excellent highway access.

It is home to the National Airline History Museum. Though this museum primarily contains artifacts from TWA (due to the fact that most of its volunteers are local retired TWA employees), it is dedicated to airline history in general.  A second museum, The TWA Museum, is housed in the original terminal that it was founded in at 10 Richards Road and is dedicated to the history of TWA. The airport also hosts the Aviation Expo (Air Show), most years, usually in August.

Facilities and aircraft

The airport covers 700 acres (283 ha) at an elevation of 757 feet (231 m). It has two runways. Runway 1/19 is 6,827 by 150 feet (2,081 x 46 m) concrete with an EMAS at both ends. Runway 3/21 is 5,050 by 100 feet (1,539 x 30 m) asphalt.

Construction on runway 1-19 is complete and both runways are in use to their full length.

Taxiway H was at one time part of runway 17/35, which was closed after an FAA decision on the required separation between terminal buildings and the runway.

The airport is on the north side of the confluence of the Kansas River and Missouri River.  Levees protected the airport relatively well during the Great Flood of 1951 and the Great Flood of 1993 although there was standing water.  The 1951 flood devastated the Fairfax airport and caused Kansas City to build what would become Kansas City International Airport away from the river to keep the TWA overhaul base in the area after it had been destroyed in the flood at Fairfax.

Kansas City, MO Aviation Department announced plans on October 17, 2006 to build a $20 million aircraft hangar complex at the Charles B. Wheeler Downtown Airport including: 122 T-hangars, 13 box hangars, a  terminal building with offices, a pilots' lounge, meeting rooms and a destination restaurant.

In the year ending September 30, 2022 the airport had 114,975 aircraft operations, average 315 per day: 77% general aviation, 21% air taxi, 2.2% military, and <1% commercial. 176 aircraft were then based at the airport: 76 single-engine and 23 multi-engine airplanes, 66 jet airplanes, and 11 helicopters.

Cargo

Accidents and incidents
 On March 31, 1931, Notre Dame Coach Knute Rockne was killed on a Transcontinental & Western Air flight from Kansas City to Los Angeles when the Fokker F-10 trimotor broke up in a storm over Bazaar, Kansas. The crash resulted in the grounding of all of the wooden wing Fokker airliners nationwide due to wood rot. It also nearly bankrupted TWA and forced them (and others) to replace their fleet with newer all-metal aircraft.
 On June 30, 1956, Trans World Airlines flight 2, a Lockheed Super Constellation, was bound for Kansas City Downtown Airport when it collided with a United Airlines Douglas DC-7 over the Grand Canyon. All 128 aboard both aircraft were killed.
 On May 22, 1962, Continental Airlines Flight 11 Boeing 707 en route from Chicago O'Hare International Airport to Kansas City Downtown Airport exploded over Unionville, Missouri. All 45 on board were killed.
 On July 1, 1965, Continental Airlines Flight 12 Boeing 707 from Los Angeles International Airport landed in heavy rain and was unable to stop due to hydroplaning. It impacted a blast mound and broke into 3 pieces, but all 66 on board survived.
 On August 6, 1966, Braniff Airways Flight 250 BAC One-Eleven left Kansas City Downtown Airport headed for Omaha and crashed near Falls City, Nebraska, killing all 42 on board.
 On January 12, 1970, the Kansas City Chiefs' charter flight returning from New Orleans International Airport following their Super Bowl IV victory over the Minnesota Vikings was diverted to the then-unfinished Kansas City International Airport (MCI) due to a runway incursion by fans hoping to greet the Chiefs upon landing at the Downtown airport. 
 On August 20, 2011, pilot Bryan Jensen was killed when his Vertical Unlimited 12 (a modified Pitts 12) crashed during the Kansas City Air Expo.
 On August 5, 2013, a construction contractor working on a taxiway near runway 1 discovered human remains buried in the ground.

See also
 List of airports in Missouri
 Missouri World War II Army Airfields

References

External links
 Charles B. Wheeler Downtown Airport, official site
 Aerial image as of February 2002 from USGS The National Map
 Airport diagram as of 1956
 
 

Airports in Missouri
Transportation in Clay County, Missouri
Transportation buildings and structures in Kansas City, Missouri
Buildings and structures in Clay County, Missouri
Airports established in 1927
Airfields of the United States Army Air Forces in Missouri